Toshiaki  is a masculine Japanese given name.

Possible writings
Toshiaki can be written using many different combinations of kanji characters. Some examples:

敏明, "agile, bright"
敏朗, "agile, clear"
敏晃, "agile, clear"
敏章, "agile, chapter"
敏亮, "agile, clear"
敏昭, "agile, clear"
俊明, "talented, bright"
俊朗, "talented, clear"
俊晃, "talented, clear"
俊章, "talented, chapter"
俊亮, "talented, clear"
俊昭, "talented, clear"
利明, "benefit, bright"
利朗, "benefit, clear"
利晃, "benefit, clear"
利章, "benefit, crystal"
年明, "year, bright"
年晶, "year, sparkle"
寿明, "long life, bright"
寿旭, "long life, rising sun"

The name can also be written in hiragana としあき or katakana トシアキ.

Notable people with the name
, Japanese fencer
, Japanese politician
, Japanese field hockey player
, Japanese cyclist
, Japanese footballer
, Japanese rugby union player
, Japanese mathematician
, Japanese baseball player
, Japanese footballer and manager
, Japanese triple jumper
, Japanese musician
, Japanese manga artist
, Japanese musician
, Japanese long-distance runner
, Japanese actor
, Japanese comedian
, Japanese professional wrestler
, Japanese samurai and general
, Japanese volleyball player
, Japanese shogi player
, Japanese swimmer
, Japanese Nordic combined skier
, aka Shinkiro, Japanese illustrator and conceptual artist
, Japanese boxer
, Japanese golfer
, Japanese table tennis player
, real name Toshiaki Muko (向 俊昭), Japanese sumo wrestler
, Japanese film director and screenwriter

Japanese masculine given names